Christopher Paul O'Connor  (born 18 December 1968 in Epsom, Surrey) is a British diplomat. He served as Consul-General in Los Angeles from 2013 to 2017. Prior to that he was Ambassador to Tunisia.

O'Connor studied at the Fitzwilliam College, Cambridge and Durham University. He was made an Officer of the Order of the British Empire in the 2012 New Year Honours.

Honours
 Officer of the Most Excellent Order of the British Empire - 2012

References

Living people
Ambassadors of the United Kingdom to Tunisia
Alumni of Fitzwilliam College, Cambridge
Alumni of Durham University
Officers of the Order of the British Empire
1968 births